DeWitt Clarke Jennings (June 21, 1871 – March 1, 1937) was an American film and stage actor. He appeared in 17 Broadway plays between 1906 and 1920, and in more than 150 films between 1915 and 1937.

Biography
He was born in Cameron, Missouri on June 21, 1871 to Georgia S. and Oliver A. Jennings. In 1935, Jennings played Sailing Master Fryer in Mutiny on the Bounty with Clark Gable and Charles Laughton. He died in Hollywood, California on March 1, 1937.

Partial filmography

 The Deep Purple (1915) - Gordon Laylock
 The Warrens of Virginia (1915) - Minor Role (uncredited)
 At Bay (1915) - Judson Flagg
 Sporting Blood (1916) - Dave Garrison
 The Little American (1917) - English Barrister
 The Hillcrest Mystery (1918) - Tom Cameron
 Three Sevens (1921) - Samuel Green
 The Greater Claim (1921) - Richard Everard Sr
 The Golden Snare (1921) - 'Fighting' Fitzgerald
 Beating the Game (1921) - G.B. Lawson
 The Invisible Power (1921) - Mark Shadwell
 Alias Ladyfingers (1921) - Lt. Ambrose
 There Are No Villains (1921) - Detective Flint
 The Poverty of Riches (1921) - Lyons
 From the Ground Up (1921) - Mr. Mortimer
 The Right That Failed (1922) - Mr. Talbot
 The Face Between (1922) - The Doctor
 Sherlock Brown (1922) - J.J. Wallace
 Flesh and Blood (1922) - Detective Doyle
 Mixed Faces (1922) - Murray McGuire
 Within the Law (1923) - Inspector Burke
 Out of Luck (1923) - Capt. Bristol
 Circus Days (1923) - Daly
 Blinky (1923) - Colonel 'Raw Meat' Islip
 The Heart Bandit (1924) - Pat O'Connell
 Name the Man (1924) - Dan Collister
 By Divine Right (1924) - Tug Wilson
 The Enemy Sex (1924) - Harrigan Blood
 The Gaiety Girl (1924) - John Kershaw
 Hit and Run (1924) - Joe Burns
 The Desert Outlaw (1924) - Doc McChesney
 Merton of the Movies (1924) - Jeff Baird
 The Silent Watcher (1924) - Stuart, the detective
 Along Came Ruth (1924) - Capt. Miles Standish
 The Deadwood Coach (1924) - Jim Shields - in play
 The Re-Creation of Brian Kent (1925) - Detective Ross
 Go Straight (1925) - The Hunter
 The Mystic (1925) - Director of Police
 Don't (1925) - Mr. Moffat
 The Splendid Road (1925) - Capt. Bashford
 Chip of the Flying U (1926) - J.G. Whitmore
 The Passionate Quest (1926) - Benjamin Stone
 The Ice Flood (1926) - James O'Neill
 Exit Smiling (1926) - Orlando Wainwright
 While London Sleeps (1926) - Inspector Burke
 The Fire Brigade (1926) - Fire Chief Wallace
 McFadden's Flats (1927) - Patrick Halloran
 Great Mail Robbery (1927) - Captain Davis
 Two Arabian Knights (1927) - American Consul
 Home Made (1927) - Mr. White
 The Night Flyer (1928) - Bucks
 Air Mail Pilot (1928) - Robert Ross
 Marry the Girl (1928) - Martin Wayland
 The Crash (1928) - Supt. Carleton
 Me, Gangster (1928)
 Red Hot Speed (1928) - Judge O'Brien
 Naughty Baby (1928) - Terry's Uncle (uncredited)
 Seven Footprints to Satan (1929) - Uncle Joe
 The Trial of Mary Dugan (1929) - Inspector Hunt
 Alibi (1929) - Officer O'Brien (uncredited)
 Thru Different Eyes (1929) - Paducah
 The Valiant (1929) - Warden Holt
 Fox Movietone Follies of 1929 (1929) - Jay Darrell
 Seven Keys to Baldpate (1929) - Mayor Jim Cargan
 New York Nights (1929) - Detective (uncredited)
 Night Ride (1930) - Capt. O'Donnell
 In the Next Room (1930) - Inspector Grady
 Captain of the Guard (1930) - Priest
 Those Who Dance (1930) - Captain O'Brien
 The Big House (1930) - Wallace
 Outside the Law (1930) - Police Chief Kennedy (uncredited)
 Scarlet Pages (1930) - Judge (uncredited)
 The Big Trail (1930) - Boat Captain Hollister (uncredited)
 The Bat Whispers (1930) - Police Captain
 Min and Bill (1930) - Groot
 The Criminal Code (1931) - Captain Gleason
 Primrose Path (1931)- Joe Malone
 The Secret Six (1931) - Chief of Police Donlin
 Salvation Nell (1931) - McGovern
 Politics (1931) - Police Chief (uncredited)
 The Squaw Man (1931) - Sheriff Bud Hardy
 Caught Plastered (1931) - Police Chief H.A. Morton
 A Dangerous Affair (1931) - City Editor
 The Deceiver (1931) - Inspector Dunn
 Arrowsmith (1931) - Mr. B.W. Tozer (uncredited)
 Dancers in the Dark (1932) - Police Sergeant McGroody
 Night Court (1932) - Court Policeman (uncredited)
 By Whose Hand? (1932) - City Editor (uncredited)
 The Washington Masquerade (1932) - Senate Board of Inquiry Member (uncredited)
 Midnight Morals (1932) - Dan McKennan
 Movie Crazy (1932) - Mr. Hall
 Speak Easily (1932) - Sheriff of Lincoln County (uncredited)
 Tess of the Storm Country (1932) - Game Warden (uncredited)
 Silver Dollar (1932) - The Mine Foreman
 Central Park (1932) - Police Desk Sergeant Monahan (uncredited)
 The Match King (1932) - Bodensky (uncredited)
 Ladies They Talk About (1933) - Detective Tracy (uncredited)
 Mystery of the Wax Museum (1933) - Police Captain
 Grand Slam (1933) - Private Detective R.J. Flynn (uncredited)
 A Lady's Profession (1933) - Mr. Stephens
 Reform Girl (1933) - Capt. Balfour
 Strictly Personal (1933) - Inspector Flynn
 Song of the Eagle (1933) - Chief of Police / Colonel Hellfire Harry (uncredited)
 Made on Broadway (1933) - Moriarty (uncredited)
 Fighting with Kit Carson (1933) - Army Colonel (Ch. 1) (uncredited)
 One Year Later (1933) - Deputy Russell
 Golden Harvest (1933) - Sheriff (uncredited)
 I Loved a Woman (1933) - Banker (uncredited)
 Police Car 17 (1933) - Captain T. J. Hart
 Day of Reckoning (1933) - First Deputy (uncredited)
 From Headquarters (1933) - Third-Degree Detective (uncredited)
 The Women in His Life (1933) - Warden (uncredited)
 On Your Guard (1933) - Joshua Perkins
 Fugitive Lovers (1934) - Warden (uncredited)
 The Meanest Gal in Town (1934) - Police Chief (uncredited)
 Massacre (1934) - Sheriff Jennings
 She Made Her Bed (1934) - Show Boss (uncredited)
 The Fighting Rookie (1934) - Police Commissioner
 Little Man, What Now? (1934) - Emil Kleinholz
 Operator 13 (1934) - Artilleryman (uncredited)
 A Man's Game (1934) - Chief Jordan
 Charlie Chan's Courage (1934) - Constable Brackett
 The Cat's-Paw (1934) - Pete - Policeman (uncredited)
 Take the Stand (1934) - Police Commissioner
 Death on the Diamond (1934) - Patterson
 The President Vanishes (1934) - Edward Cullen
 Secret of the Chateau (1934) - Louis Bardou
 A Wicked Woman (1934) - The Sheriff
 Murder on a Honeymoon (1935) - Captain Beegle
 A Dog of Flanders (1935) - Carl Cogez
 Mary Jane's Pa (1935) - Sheriff
 Village Tale (1935) - Sheriff Ramsey
 Front Page Woman (1935) - Police Lieutenant (uncredited)
 The Daring Young Man (1935) - Mayor's Committee Official (uncredited)
 The Farmer Takes a Wife (1935) - Freight Agent (uncredited)
 Mutiny on the Bounty (1935) - Fryer
 I Dream Too Much (1935) - Man Yelling for Food (uncredited)
 Exclusive Story (1936) - Captain (uncredited)
 Sins of Man (1936) - Twichelesko
 The Crime of Dr. Forbes (1936) - Judge Benson
 Kelly the Second (1936) - Judge
 Sing, Baby, Sing (1936) - Mr. Lee, the Landlord (uncredited)
 The Accusing Finger (1936) - Prison Warden
 We Who Are About to Die (1937) - Mike Brannigan
 Nancy Steele Is Missing! (1937) - Doctor on Farm
 Midnight Taxi (1937) - Capt. Wainwright (scenes deleted)
 That I May Live (1937) - Chief of Police
 This Is My Affair (1937) - Bradley Wallace
 Fifty Roads to Town (1937) - Captain Galloway
 Slave Ship (1937) - Snodgrass

References

External links

1871 births
1937 deaths
20th-century American male actors
Male actors from Missouri
American male film actors
American male silent film actors
American male stage actors
People from Cameron, Missouri
Burials at Forest Lawn Memorial Park (Glendale)